Presidential Lakes Estates is an unincorporated community and census-designated place (CDP) located within Pemberton Township, in Burlington County, New Jersey, United States. As of the 2010 United States Census, the CDP's population was 2,365.

Geography
According to the United States Census Bureau, the CDP had a total area of 1.084 square miles (2.809 km2), including 1.063 square miles (2.754 km2) of land and 0.021 square miles (0.055 km2) of water (1.95%).

Demographics

Census 2010

Census 2000
As of the 2000 United States Census there were 2,332 people, 740 households, and 629 families living in the CDP. The population density was 865.8/km2 (2,235.8/mi2). There were 774 housing units at an average density of 287.3/km2 (742.1/mi2). The racial makeup of the CDP was 79.03% White, 12.14% African American, 0.34% Native American, 2.27% Asian, 0.09% Pacific Islander, 1.76% from other races, and 4.37% from two or more races. Hispanic or Latino of any race were 6.56% of the population.

There were 740 households, out of which 45.0% had children under the age of 18 living with them, 69.2% were married couples living together, 10.1% had a female householder with no husband present, and 14.9% were non-families. 9.9% of all households were made up of individuals, and 2.2% had someone living alone who was 65 years of age or older. The average household size was 3.15 and the average family size was 3.35.

In the CDP the population was spread out, with 28.9% under the age of 18, 8.7% from 18 to 24, 32.5% from 25 to 44, 24.2% from 45 to 64, and 5.7% who were 65 years of age or older. The median age was 34 years. For every 100 females, there were 105.5 males. For every 100 females age 18 and over, there were 99.9 males.

The median income for a household in the CDP was $68,276, and the median income for a family was $68,311. Males had a median income of $43,241 versus $28,947 for females. The per capita income for the CDP was $22,995. None of the families and 2.5% of the population were living below the poverty line, including no under eighteens and 14.9% of those over 64.

References

External links
 City-data.com profile

Census-designated places in Burlington County, New Jersey
Pemberton Township, New Jersey
Populated places in the Pine Barrens (New Jersey)